Haricharan Seshadri, known mononymously as Haricharan (born 20 March 1987), is an Indian Carnatic vocalist, playback singer, and musician who predominantly works in Tamil, Malayalam, Telugu and Kannada music and cinema. He sung 2000 songs in films and albums. 

He recorded his first Tamil film song for the film Kaadhal, in Joshua Sridhar's music when he was 17, and went on to record three songs in his debut movie. His song "Unakkena Iruppen" was nominated for the National Film Awards in 2005 which became widely popular. However he became popular only after his rendition to the song, "Thuli Thuli", composed by Yuvan Shankar Raja for the movie Paiyaa (2010).

Background
Haricharan comes from Tamil music family from Chennai, India . His grandfather P. S. Ganapathy was an organiser of mic-less Carnatic concerts in the 60s under the name "Aalapanaa", and his grandmother Smt. Alamelu Ganapathy is a national awardee in Mathematics, and has been in academia for more than 35 years. His father G. Seshadri is an artist through AIR, and a bank employee, and his mother Latha, a librarian in P. S. Senior Secondary School. Haricharan started learning Carnatic music at an early age of seven under Smt. Sethu Mahadevan, and then from stalwarts like K. V. Narayanaswamy, T. M. Prabhavathi and P. S. Narayanaswamy.

He recorded his first Tamil film song for the film Kaadhal, in Joshua Sridhar's music when he was 17, and went on to record three songs in his debut movie. His song "Unakkena Iruppen" was nominated for the National Film Awards in 2005 which became widely popular. Since then he has recorded several hit numbers for various music directors across the south, predominantly in Tamil, Kannada, Telugu and Malayalam languages. He became more famous after his more recent song, "Thuli Thuli". Haricharan is one of the most used singers in Yuvan Shankar Raja's music. He has also sung Rotaract Change Anthem for RI Dist 3230.

In 2012, Haricharan sang alongside Rajinikanth for the song "Maattram Ondrudhaan Maradhadhu" from soundtrack of Kochadaiiyaan, which was composed by A. R. Rahman and released in 2014.

Awards

Won
Filmfare Awards South
2015 - Filmfare Award for Best Male Playback Singer – Malayalam - Banglore Days
IIFA Utsavam
2016 -IIFA Utsavam Award for Best Playback Singer - Male - Telugu - Baahubali
2016 - IIFA Utsavam Award for Best Playback Singer - Male - Tamil - Baahubali
2017- IIFA Utsavam Award for Best Playback Singer - Male - Telugu -Krishnagadi Veera premagadha	
Asianet Film Awards
2015-Best Playback singer - Banglore Days

Discography

2004

2005

2006

2007

2008

2009

2010

2011

2012

2013

2014

2015

2016

2017

2018

2019

2020

2021

2022

Non-film songs

2021

References

External links
 
 
 

Discographies
 Raaga.com
 Thiraipaadal.com
 Haricharan on Devaragam
 Haricharan on Saavn

Indian male playback singers
Male Carnatic singers
Carnatic singers
Telugu playback singers
Tamil playback singers
Kannada playback singers
Tamil singers
Living people
1987 births
Musicians from Palakkad
Singers from Kerala
Film musicians from Kerala
21st-century Indian male classical singers
Indian folk-pop singers
Indian male pop singers